Polygonella robusta, also known as Polygonum nesomii, is a shrubby perennial flowering plant  in the buckwheat (Polygonaceae) family. It is endemic to the U.S. state of Florida where it is a member of the sandhill plant community. Common names for it include largeflower jointweed and 
sandhill wireweed. P. robusta produces an abundance of flowers that are surrounded by papery bracts which range in color from white and light pink to deep rose. After flowering, usually in October, the plant maintains a rosette of basal foliage through the winter.

References

Polygonoideae
Endemic flora of Florida
Flora without expected TNC conservation status